Joseph Charles Orengo (November 29, 1914 – July 24, 1988) was an American infielder in Major League Baseball who played for five teams from 1939 to 1945, playing all four infield positions. He was born in San Francisco, California, and died there at age 73.

In 366 games over six seasons, Orengo posted a .238 batting average (266-for-1120) with 129 runs, 17 home runs, 122 RBIs and 156 bases on balls. Defensively, he recorded an overall .966 fielding percentage.
He was married to Alma Orengo and had 4 children.

External links

1914 births
1988 deaths
Major League Baseball infielders
Brooklyn Dodgers players
St. Louis Cardinals players
New York Giants (NL) players
Detroit Tigers players
Chicago White Sox players
Baseball players from San Francisco
Springfield Red Wings players
Springfield Cardinals players
Houston Buffaloes players
Columbus Red Birds players
Sacramento Solons managers
Sacramento Solons players
Jersey City Giants players
St. Paul Saints (AA) players
Salt Lake City Bees players
Yakima Bears players
Minor league baseball managers